Xinyi District may refer to:

 Xinyi District, Keelung, a district in Keelung, Taiwan
 Xinyi District, Taipei, a district in Taipei, Taiwan